Aristocrat Ranchettes is an unincorporated community and a census-designated place (CDP) located in and governed by Weld County, Colorado, United States. The population of the Aristocrat Ranchettes CDP was 1,715 at the United States Census 2020. The Fort Lupton post office  serves the area. The CDP is a part of the Greeley, CO Metropolitan Statistical Area.

Geography

Demographics

See also

Outline of Colorado
Index of Colorado-related articles
State of Colorado
Colorado cities and towns
Colorado census designated places
Colorado counties
Weld County, Colorado
Colorado metropolitan areas
Front Range Urban Corridor
North Central Colorado Urban Area
Denver-Aurora-Boulder, CO Combined Statistical Area
Greeley, CO Metropolitan Statistical Area

References

External links

Weld County website

Census-designated places in Weld County, Colorado
Census-designated places in Colorado